Dragomir Mrsic (born 2 October 1969), nicknamed Gago is a Bosnian-born Swedish actor, sports consultant and sports leader.

Life and career
Mrsic was born in the Rasavci village near Prijedor, SR Bosnia and Herzegovina, Yugoslavia, to father Momir and mother Radojka. His father got a job in Sweden in the late 1960s. Dragomir moved with his mother and two older siblings to Sweden aged a month and a half, and was brought up in Fittja, a suburb of southern Stockholm. His father worked as a chef at Grand Hôtel in the city, his mother as a cleaner at the local school. His father was a functioning alcoholic. At 14 years of age he witnessed his brother's friend's suicide by jumping. His two siblings, sister Ranka and brother Radomir "Rajko", died of drugs use.

He has been trained in Taekwondo since his youth, and has a black belt. His childhood idol was Bruce Lee. At 18 years of age, in 1987, he became the Nordic Champion in taekwondo. In 1990, he and his friend Liam Norberg were involved in the robbery of bank Götabanken; he stood guard some hundred meters away. He was arrested and sentenced to three years and six months in prison for the robbery, and served his sentence at Hall Prison. He studied Buddhism in prison. After serving his sentence, he entered into a sports college. He then started a gym, and became a sports consultant. He was a top program trainer in the Swedish Olympics Committee from 2000 to 2004.

After a few minor acting roles, such as in the Wallander film Kuriren (2009), he got his big break out in 2010 as Mrado, in the critically acclaimed film Easy Money (2010).

In 2014, he co-starred in the Tom Cruise film, Edge of Tomorrow.

In January 2015, he gave his voice and likeness to Dragan in the video game Payday 2. Mrsic is the only cast member in the game who has previously been involved in illegal activities.

In his gym, "Extreme Training", he has trained sportspeople such as Martina Navratilova, Helen Alfredsson and Douglas Murray and actors such as Rooney Mara.

He also starred in Stjärnorna på slottet in seasons 2019/2020.

Mrsic is cohabitation with the PT coach Isabel Alonso. They met in 1992 and have a daughter and a son together.

Filmography

Movies

TV-series

Video Games

Writing
Dragomir Mrsic & Majsan Boström; Extreme Training: from Fittja to Hollywood, Fitnessförlaget, 2014.

Annotations

References

External links

, pronunciation demonstrated around 0:40 (non-english interview), accessed January 22, 2015.

1969 births
Swedish male actors
Living people
People from Prijedor
Swedish people of Serbian descent
Bosnia and Herzegovina expatriates in Sweden
Serbs of Bosnia and Herzegovina
Swedish criminals
Swedish male taekwondo practitioners
Serb diaspora sportspeople